Stony Point is an unincorporated community and census-designated place (CDP) in Monroe County in the U.S. state of Michigan.  The population was 1,784 at the 2020 census.  The CDP is located within Frenchtown Charter Township.

Geography

The area defined by the CDP is bounded on the west by Burke Road, on the northwest by Brest Road, and on the north by Point aux Peaux Road. The Enrico Fermi Nuclear Generating Station is adjacent to the north.

Demographics

At the 2000 census, there were 1,775 people, 616 households and 492 families residing in the CDP. The racial makeup of the CDP was 96.17% White, 0.56% African American, 1.30% Native American, 0.34% Asian, 0.11% Pacific Islander, 0.51% from other races, and 1.01% from two or more races. Hispanic or Latino of any race were 2.25% of the population.

There were 616 households, of which 43.7% had children under the age of 18 living with them, 63.1% were married couples living together, 11.0% had a female householder with no husband present, and 20.1% were non-families. 16.1% of all households were made up of individuals, and 5.5% had someone living alone who was 65 years of age or older.  The average household size was 2.88 and the average family size was 3.23.

30.5% of the population were under the age of 18, 7.6% from 18 to 24, 33.6% from 25 to 44, 21.5% from 45 to 64, and 6.8% who were 65 years of age or older. The median age was 32 years. For every 100 females, there were 109.1 males. For every 100 females age 18 and over, there were 103.1 males.

The median household income was $49,167 and the median family income was $59,583. Males had a median income of $46,542 compared with $30,385 for females. The per capita income for the CDP was $22,667. About 3.3% of families and 4.2% of the population were below the poverty line, including 3.3% of those under age 18 and 5.5% of those age 65 or over.

References

Unincorporated communities in Monroe County, Michigan
Census-designated places in Michigan
Unincorporated communities in Michigan
Census-designated places in Monroe County, Michigan
Michigan populated places on Lake Erie